A. Shane Massey (born June 28, 1975) is a Republican member of the South Carolina Senate, representing the 25th District since 2007. Massey became the Republican Majority Leader for the Senate on April 6, 2016.

On March 20, 2009, Massey announced that he would be a Republican candidate for the US House of Representatives South Carolina's 3rd congressional district, but quickly pulled out, citing a desire to keep his family in South Carolina.

Massey was named a 2014 Aspen Institute Rodel Fellow.

During the 2020 election, which took place during the COVID-19 pandemic, Massey voted to prevent ballot drop boxes from being used during the election in South Carolina.

References

External links
Congressional Campaign Website
Official State Senate Webpage
Project Vote Smart - Senator A. Shane Massey (SC)

1975 births
21st-century American politicians
Living people
People from Greeneville, Tennessee
Republican Party South Carolina state senators